Priya Habbathannahalli Mohan (born 15 March 2003) is an Indian athlete. She won the 400m senior National Championships in 2021 with a time of 53.29 seconds. She won the bronze medal in the mixed 4×400m relay at the U-20 World Athletics Championships 2021 held at Nairobi, Kenya.

International career

References

External links

2003 births
Living people
Indian female sprinters
21st-century Indian women